Josco Football Club is an Indian football club based in Ernakulam, Kerala. The club was founded in 2007 and previously they have completed in I-League 2nd Division, then second tier of Indian football, alongside Kerala Premier League.

History
Josco Football Club was formed in 2007 by the owner of business conglomerate Josco Group, Tony Jose. Team was led into Ernakulam Second Division with the then coach and later assistant, T. G. Purushothaman. TK Chathunny joined the club as coach in late 2008.

Josco FC took part in 2011 I-League 2nd Division in 2010 and narrowly missed out on promotion owing to inexperience at this level. The club then skipped out of next season in the 2012 I-League 2nd Division.

References

Football clubs in Kerala
Association football clubs established in 2007
2007 establishments in Kerala
Football clubs in Kochi
I-League 2nd Division clubs